This is a list of instruments by Hornbostel-Sachs number, covering those instruments that are classified under 322.11 under that system. These instruments may be known as arched harps. These are instruments in which one or more strings produce sound by vibrating, and where the string carrier and resonator are physically united, with strings at right angles to the sound table, no pillar and a neck that curves away from the resonator. The arched harp is probably an evolution of the musical bow, distinguished by the addition of strings and the fusion of the string holder and the soundbox.

Arched harps are found in Southeast Asia, East Africa, and elsewhere, and are historically strongly associated with Ancient Egypt and India. Two categories of arched harps exist, though are not distinguished in the Hornbostel-Sachs system: those in which only one stick constitutes both the neck and the string holder of the instrument and those in which two separate sticks are used. The oldest harps of Egypt used the one stick construction, but this later changed to two sticks, which is now also used in the Burmese saung gauk and many other forms.

The arched harp saung gauk is seen as a national instrument of Myanmar, and its history there dates back centuries. In the music of India, arched harps are strongly associated with Buddhism, and are frequently depicted in images of Buddhist deities and were formerly played in the royal courts of Buddhist dynasties. The arched harp receded in prominence in India after the rise of Hinduism in that country, and the instrument's modern presence in India is apparently limited to the Pardhan people of Madhya Pradesh.

The arched harps of Egypt, sub-Saharan Africa and Myanmar share a few features, including a stick to which each string is attached at one end and a piece of skin with a cavity underneath it, attached to the stick. However, it can not be conclusively determined that these instruments are related to each other. The similarities between the arched harps of Southeast Asia and East Africa are part of a broad group of cultural relations, and the distribution of arched harps in Africa follows roughly the route by which the yam apparently spread across the continent after being introduced from Indonesia. The Egyptian shoulder harp is also the earliest known instrument to have soundholes.

These instruments may be classified with a suffix, based on how the strings are caused to vibrate.

4: Hammers or beaters
5: Bare hands and fingers
6: Plectrum
7: Bowing
71: Using a bow
72: Using a wheel
73: Using a ribbon
8: Keyboard
9: Using a mechanical drive

List

References

Notes

322.11